Ipomoea chrysocalyx is a vine in the family Convolvulaceae. It is endemic to Ecuador.  Its natural habitat is subtropical or tropical dry forests.

Taxonomy 
It was first described in 1982 by D.F. Austin. The species epithet, chrysocalyx, is derived from the Greek  chrysos ("gold") and kalyx, ("cup" or "calyx"), and describes the plant as having golden calyces.

Threats 
When last assessed in 2004, it was found that the population was severely fragmented with a continuing decline in mature individuals. and that there was a continuing decline in the area, extent and quality of its habitat.

References 

chrysocalyx
Endemic flora of Ecuador
Vulnerable flora of South America
Taxonomy articles created by Polbot